Ignaz Jastrow (13 September 1856, Nakel - 2 May 1937, Berlin) was a German economist and historian.

Biography
He was educated at the universities of Breslau, Berlin, and Göttingen.  He became a university docent at Berlin in 1885 and was Leopold von Ranke's assistant in historical work.
In 1904 he pursued industrial investigations in the United States, and in 1905 became professor of Administrative Science at Berlin. One daughter, Elisabeth Jastrow, was a classical archaeologist; the other Beate Jastrow Hahn, was an accomplished horticulturalist and author of 5 books. His granddaughter, Cornelia Oberlander was a highly respected landscape architect.

Works
 
 Geschichte des deutschen Einheitstraumes und seiner Erfüllung (1884; fourth edition, 1891)
 Socialliberal (1893, second edition, 1894)
 Die Einrichtung von Arbeitsnachweisverbänden (second edition, 1900)
 Deutsche Geschichte im Zeitalter der Hohenstaufen (1879-1901), with George Winter
 Kaufmannsbildung und Hochschulbildung (1907)
 Bürgertum und Staatsverwaltung (1907)
 Handelshochschulen (1909)
 Gedächtnisrede auf Dunker (1911)
 Arbeiterschutz (1912)
 Geld und Kredit (1914)
He edited the Jahresberichte der Geschichtswissenschaft (1881–94); Sociale Praxis (1895–97);  Das Gewerbegericht (1896 et seq.); and Der Arbeitsmarkt (1897 et seq.).

Notes

References

External links

 

1856 births
1937 deaths
People from Nakło nad Notecią
20th-century German historians
German economists
People from the Province of Posen
University of Göttingen alumni
Humboldt University of Berlin alumni
Academic staff of the Humboldt University of Berlin
University of Breslau alumni
German male non-fiction writers
19th-century German historians